Otoceratina is an extinct suborder of cephalopods belonging to the Ammonite subclass in the order Ceratitida.

References 

 The Paleobiology Database Accessed on 9/24/07

 
Mollusc suborders